Ali Nazem – was an Azerbaijani poet, writer, and literary critic of Azerbaijani literature.

Early life 

Nazem was born on 24 November 1906 in Tabriz. He graduated from the Leningrad Institute of Oriental Studies and later completed his postgraduate studies in Moscow, where he conducted research and teaching.

Writings 

His writing was first published in 1921 in the newspaper "Ishtirak" ("Communist"). In 1930, Nazem became a member of the Communist Party and served as an active Marxist literary critic. He is now considered one of the founders of Marxist criticism in Azerbaijan, known for his work on the history of classical literature (about MFAkhundov, J. Mamedkulizade, MA Sabir, etc.)

In 1937 he was, together with A. Jawad, H. Javid, Mushfig, Musahanly, Yusif Vazir, S. Hussein, Cantemir, Talibli, and A. Razi, declared an "agent of the German-Japanese fascism, Trotskyist, Musavat and nationalist deviators." In 1937, he was arrested and died in prison on 23 August 1941. In 1957 Nazem was rehabilitated.

Notes

External links 

 Ali Nazem, Назим / Под ред. Surkov, Alexei Alexandrovich. — Concise Literary Encyclopedia: Great Russian Encyclopedia (published), 1962. — Т. 5. — С. 96.
 Назим / И. К. Луппол, М. М. Розенталь, С. М. Третьяков, С. С. Лесневский. — Первый всесоюзный съезд советских писателей, 1934. Стенографический отчет. Приложения: Советский писатель, 1990. — Т. 2. — С. 56.
 Əli Nazim (1906–1941)- tənqidçi, ədəbiyyatşünas
 Əli Nazimin tənqidçilik sənəti

1906 births
1941 deaths
Azerbaijani literary critics
Azerbaijani literary theorists
20th-century Iranian poets
Azerbaijani poets
20th-century poets
Iranian emigrants to the Soviet Union
Soviet rehabilitations
Soviet literary historians
Soviet male writers
20th-century male writers
Poets from Tabriz